Harry Frederick Wunsch (November 20, 1910 – April 30, 1954) was a guard in the National Football League. He played with the Green Bay Packers during the 1934 NFL season.

References

1910 births
1954 deaths
American football guards
Notre Dame Fighting Irish football players
Green Bay Packers players
Players of American football from Chicago